"Reason" is the 6th single release from J-Pop artist Nami Tamaki. It was released on 11-10-2004, and ranked #2 on the Oricon charts. It was also used as the ending theme to the anime Mobile Suit Gundam SEED Destiny.

Track listing
 "Reason" Lyrics: shungo   Music: Yasuo Otani
 "Promised Land" Lyrics: Saeko Nishio   Music: Yuta Nakano
 "Truth" Lyrics: mavie   Music: Miki Watanabe
 "Reason" (Instrumental)

Disambiguation

 Reason (Album Version)
 Track 2 on the Make Progress album.

 Reason (Single Version)
 Track 1 on the Reason single.

 Reason (Mobilesuit Gundam SEED Destiny Complete Best Version)
 Same as the previous two but only found on the special soundtrack album to Gundam SEED Destiny, Mobile Suit Gundam SEED Destiny Complete Best as track number 2.

 Reason -NYLON STAY COOL MIX-
 This is a remix of Reason found on the special album Mobile Suit Gundam SEED Destiny Complete Best as track number 11.

 Reason (reproduction ~flash forward mix~)
 A remix of Reason found on the album Make Progress as track 14.

 Reason (Instrumental)
 Is the version of Reason with Nami's vocals cut out. Only found on the Reason single.

2004 singles
Nami Tamaki songs
2004 songs